Jayadewa or Jayadeva (Sanskrit: जयदेव ; full title: Hwan Nāyaka tuhan Pailah Jayadewa) was the name of the Lord Minister of Pailah at the time that the Laguna Copperplate Inscription was written in .  According to the document, he served as the representative  of the "Commander in Chief" in pardoning the descendants of an individual named Namwaran of his debts. Although no other records describe his life and works, Jayadewa is an important figure in Philippine historiography because he is one of the persons clearly identified in the LCI, which is the earliest known written document found in the Philippines.

Personal life

He married Dayang Bukah, as in exchange to clear the debit of 1 kati and 8 suwarnas of Bukah's parents which is Namwaran and Dayang Angkatan.

"On this occasion, Lady Angkatan, and her brother, Buka, the children of the Honourable Namwaran, were awarded a complete pardon from the Overall Leader [King] of Tundún, represented by the Lord Minister of Pailáh, Jayadewa."

See also
 Laguna Copperplate Inscription (LCI) - the oldest written document in the Philippines
 Senapati - a Sanskrit title and rank for an Admiral or General
 List of sovereign state leaders in the Philippines
 List of ancient Philippine consorts

References

Filipino datus, rajas and sultans
History of the Philippines (900–1565)
People from Tondo, Manila
Filipino nobility